OOTS may refer to:
 Orchestra of the Swan, an English chamber orchestra
 The Order of the Stick, a comedic webcomic